Hong Kong Baptist University Affiliated School Wong Kam Fai Secondary and Primary School (abbreviated as HKBUAS or HKBU WKFS) is a Direct Subsidy school in Shek Mun, Sha Tin, Hong Kong. It is the first affiliated school opened by a university in Hong Kong. The school was officially established in 2006, and the first batch of students began attending classes in September of the same year.

History
In 2013, the school announced to build an integrated building, later renamed as "Wong Liu Wai Man Building" (王廖惠文大樓). The building was built on the two basketball courts, which is originated in the G/F of the secondary division. The building is opened in early 2016.

School facilities 
Library 
Hall 
Lecture theatre
Atrium
Sky garden 
Art gallery
Dance room
Indoor gymnasium 
Playground 
Running track 
Rock climbing wall
Indoor playground 
Indoor running track

Student chambers

Primary division
(Justice), its representative colour is yellow
(Wisdom), its representative colour is blue
(Kindness), its representative colour is green
(Courtesy), its representative colour is red
(Faith), its representative colour is purple

Secondary division
(Aristotle), its representative colour is yellow
(Beethoven), its representative colour is blue
(Columbus), its representative colour is green
(Da Vinci), its representative colour is red
(Einstein), its representative colour is purple

Historical student union in secondary division 

2011-2012：Sprout
2012-2013：Helios
2013-2014：CaterPillar
2014-2015：H2O
2015-2016：Phoenix
2016：Zipper
2016-2017：DNA
2017-2018: Patronus
2018-2019: Polaris
2019-2020: Linear
2020-2021: Parasol
2021-2022: Pixel
2022-2023: Panorama

Class structure and curriculum
There are altogether 30 classes in Secondary division, 5 classes (A,B,C,D,E) in each grade.
Grade 7: 5 classes
Grade 8: 5 classes
Grade 9: 5 classes
Grade 10: 5 classes 
Grade 11: 5 classes 
Grade 12: 5 classes 

Grade 7 to 9 (F1-F3) offer a broad general curriculum with a good balance among languages, arts, science, cultural as well as liberal studies and physical education.

Students can choose to study either Hong Kong Diploma of Secondary Education Examination (HKDSE) or GCE A-Level curriculum in grade 10 to 12 (F4-F6). For Students who take the Hong Kong Diploma of Secondary Education Examination (HKDSE) at the end of grade 12 (F6), they can use the Joint University Programmes Admission System (JUPAS) for the admission to tertiary institutes.

In grade 10 to 12 (F4-F6) (NSS curriculum), students can choose 2 to 3 electives subjects besides the 4 core subjects: Chinese, English, Mathematics and Liberal Studies.

There is one class arranged in grade 11 to 12 (F5-F6) for students who would like to take GCE A-Level exam, grade 10 (F4) students can join the IGCSE top up course arranged by the school.

As an E.M.I. (English as the Medium of Instruction) school, Wong Kam Fai Secondary and Primary School adopts English as the teaching medium in most subjects with the aim of achieving biliteracy (Chinese and English) and trilingualism with the inclusion of Putonghua.

All subjects, except Chinese Language, Chinese History, liberal studies are taught in English unless you choose English as medium for the liberal studies in grade 10 to 12 (F4-F6).

Lessons are arranged on a 5-day week basis. Some school team training, uniform team training, supplementary classes and instrument classes are offered after school and on Saturdays.

Controversies

Allegations of censorship 
Some students questioned the school has political censorship, including prohibiting students from wearing black and yellow surgical masks, which hold connotations to the pro-democracy protest movement. Violators will face the risk of receiving a "demerit" from the school. In the school yearbook, the school used blurry photo to cover the protest mascot "Pepe the Frog" wallpaper in the background. The school further specified that the scope of school regulations includes online behaviour outside school.

Some students pointed out that the school has never explicitly prohibited students from participating in activities related to the 2019–2020 Hong Kong protests. After some senior students created a lennon wall and posted materials related to the protest inside the classroom, the senior staff started to ask students to remove. In addition, the school has also repeatedly discouraged students from gathering in the campus to sing the song "Glory to Hong Kong" as well as yelling out the protest slogans. Moreover, the school regulations do not have a mask guideline that requires students to wear a "normal colour" mask defined by the school.

Wong Kam Fai Secondary and Primary School replied to Apple Daily stated that they did not revised the school guidelines and rules given to students, except that if students are found bullying others and other inappropriate behaviors in the Internet, they will follow up in accordance with the established guidance and assistance mechanism. For the issue of surgical masks, the school is in line with the school's usual principles of "simple dress and appearance". It is recommended that faculty and students should wear light-coloured surgical masks. They can also be obtained from the school office if necessary. It also emphasizes that school journals, school regulations, and epidemic prevention arrangements are all internal affairs of the school.。

Covid-19 test complain
A news personage reported to the Stand News on February 9, 2021, that Wong Kam Fai Secondary and Primary School requires all faculty and staff of the school to undergo regular COVID-19 test every two weeks with no consultation to teachers beforehand. The school did not deny the relevant arrangements in, but they replied that they did not receive any objection from colleagues.。

References

External links 
 

Schools in Hong Kong
Secondary schools in Hong Kong
Sha Tin District